G. S. Melkote (16 October 1901 – 10 March 1982) was an Indian freedom fighter and parliamentarian. His complete name is Gopaliah Subbukrishna Melkote.

He was born at Berhampur in Odisha state on the auspicious day of Saraswathi Pooja. He did L.M.S. from Osmania University in 1927 and practiced for some time combining the traditional medicine with Yogic practices. He was the president of Indian Medical Association, Hyderabad branch for some time and established Patanjali Yoga Research Institute.

He participated in various activities of Indian Freedom Movement, such as the Home Rule movement, Salt Satyagraha, and Quit India movements.

After Indian independence, he contributed significantly in the development of Hyderabad state as Member of Hyderabad Assembly from Musheerabad between 1952 and 1957. He was also the finance Minister for Hyderabad state from 1952 till unification of Hyderabad and Andhra State (to form Andhra Pradesh under States reorganization act, 1956). He was elected to the Indian Parliament three times (1962, 1967 and 1977) from the Hyderabad constituency and in 1957 from Raichur constituency.

He resigned as member of Lok Sabha in 1970, also left Indian National Congress to join Telangana movement, eventually joining Telangana Praja Samithi.

His wife Vimalabai was also a freedom fighter.

References

 Melkote G. S., Luminaries of 20th Century, Part I, Potti Sreeramulu Telugu University, Hyderabad, 2005, pp: 429–30.

External links
 Rare photographs of Dr. G.S. Melkote
 Biodata of G. S. Melkote at Lok Sabha website.
 Resume can be found in the documents directory  here  in Geni. or Click here   GSM_bio.html 

1901 births
1982 deaths
India MPs 1962–1967
India MPs 1967–1970
India MPs 1971–1977
Indian independence activists from Odisha
Lok Sabha members from Andhra Pradesh
People from Ganjam district
Hyderabad State politicians
Indian National Congress politicians from Telangana
Recipients of the Padma Shri in public affairs
India MPs 1957–1962
Lok Sabha members from Karnataka
Politicians from Hyderabad, India
People from Raichur district
Indian National Congress politicians from Andhra Pradesh